The 1943 San Diego Naval Air Station Bluejackets football team represented San Diego Naval Training Station during the 1943 college football season.  The team was coached by Bo Molenda, a former Michigan football player, and played on Hull Field in San Diego, California.  The Bluejackets compiled a 7–2 record, shut our four teams, and outscored their opponents by a total of 255 to 36.  They also defeated No. 4 ranked USC in November, which at the time was riding a six game undefeated, untied, and unscored upon streak.

Schedule

References

 
San Diego Naval Training Station
San Diego Naval Training Station Bluejackets football